The Christian Democratic Party was a political party in Namibia led by Petrus "Piet" Matheus Junius. The Christian Democratic Union merged into CDP.

See also

List of political parties in Namibia

Political parties with year of establishment missing
Political parties with year of disestablishment missing
Christian democratic parties in Africa
Defunct political parties in Namibia